Feldkamp is a surname. Notable people with the surname include:

 Fred Feldkamp (1914–1981), American writer, editor, and film producer
 Karl-Heinz Feldkamp (born 1934), German footballer and manager
 Michael F. Feldkamp (born 1962), German historian and journalist
 Ariel Feldkamp (born 2000), German